Finley Duncan (died 1989) ran independent record companies in Florida.

Duncan began in the music business as a jukebox operator. He distributed jukeboxes and was a nightclub owner on Florida's Emerald Coast. He also worked at a variety of small record labels for almost 30 years beginning in the 1950s. Duncan's labels included Minaret Records and Playground Records.

Among those he recorded to his labels were  Kim Jones of Nashville in 1973 who signed an exclusive recording contract with his Minaret Records. He also worked with former Motown artist Reuben Howell, Doris Allen, Big John Hamilton, Len Wade, Leroy Lloyd and the Dukes, Count Willie and Jimmie Nelson. Other artists at his labels included Roger Binninghof, Tiny Watkins, Krankies, Paul Martin, Benninghoff, Patti Page, Genie Brooks, Johnny Adams, Josh Hamilton, and Trooper Jim Foster.

Allen's recordings were to be distributed by the Shelby Singleton Corporation. Herb Shucher founded Minaret before leaving to join Shelby Singleton's SSS organization, which took over the label a few years later in 1967.

Jim Lancaster from Memphis worked with Duncan beginning in 1970. After Duncan died he rereleased many of his recordings, including on Soul Resurrection Volume One.

Duncan established Playground Records with Shelby Singleton in Valparaiso, Florida on the Florida Panhandle near Alabama in 1969. The studio recorded singles for Duncan's  Minaret Records label Mike Quinn recorded with Duncan's Emerald Coast Records. Duncan's recordings did not sell well in their era, but many have been rerecorded and rediscovered among fans of the Southern genres.

References

Year of birth missing
1989 deaths
Record producers from Florida
Nightclub owners